Winfried Heurich (born 13 February 1940) is a German organist and composer.

Life 
Born in Neuhof, Hesse, Heurich was from 1962 to 2000 the church musician of Liebfrauen in Frankfurt am Main. In 1973 he composed songs titled Ganz nah ist dein Wort, with new texts by Huub Oosterhuis and Lothar Zenetti. From 1978, he composed many songs on lyrics by Eugen Eckert.

From 1974 to 2000 he led the Arbeitskreis Kirchenmusik und Jugendseelsorge im Bistum Limburg. He lectured at the Musikhochschule Frankfurt from 1986.

His song "Der Herr wird dich mit seiner Güte segnen", to a text by Helmut Schlegel, was the most successful entry to an international competition of the genre Neues Geistliches Lied in 1983 in Rome. He also composed the official song of the Katholikentag 1998 in Mainz, "Schnee schmilzt" (Snow melts) on a text by Eckert.

Songs 
 "Der Himmel, der ist", 1980, text: Kurt Marti
 "In uns kreist das Leben", 1987, text: Marti
 "Meine engen Grenzen", 1981, text: Eugen Eckert
 "Der Herr wird dich mit seiner Güte segnen", text: Helmut Schlegel
 "Gott, deine Liebe reicht weit", text: Eckert
 "Menschenkind, im Stall geboren", text: Eckert
 "Gebt Zeugnis von der Hoffnung", 1998, text: Eckert
 "Wunder der Nacht", 1997, text: Eckert
 "Schnee schmilzt", 1998, text: Eckert, official song for the Katholikentag 1998 in Mainz
 "Was sein wird", text: Lothar Zenetti
 "Wir sprechen verschiedene Sprachen", 1972, text: Zenetti
 "Meines Herzens Dunkel", text: Schlegel
 "Rosen blühn im Stacheldraht", text: Schlegel
 "Es bleibt dabei", 1996, text: 
 "wir messen mit knospenden zweigen", text: 
 "Wo ein Mensch Vertrauen gibt", 1975, text: 
 "Aus der Armut eines Stalles", text: Juhre

German classical organists
German male organists
German classical composers
German male classical composers
1940 births
Living people
20th-century German composers
20th-century organists
21st-century German composers
21st-century organists
20th-century German male musicians
21st-century German male musicians
Male classical organists